The Eigart is a hill located in the county of Euskirchen in the German state of North Rhine-Westphalia at , in the North Eifel.

The Eigart is situated in the High Fens-Eifel Nature Park a little east of the Eifel National Park. It lies west of the village of Berescheid in the borough of Schleiden. The hill is used for agriculture and is a starting point for walks around Berescheid, some of which also enter the nearly national park. It is also a good viewing point, from which there are views over Berescheid and the valley of the Schafbach which is part of the Olef catchment as well as other summits such as the Hohe Acht.

References 

Mountains and hills of the Eifel
Mountains and hills of North Rhine-Westphalia